Jon Jory is a theatrical director instrumental in the development of Actors Theatre of Louisville; he is also widely rumored to be the writer behind the pseudonym Jane Martin.

Childhood
Jory is a child of Hollywood character actors as his father Victor Jory played Jonas Wilkerson, the scheming overseer in the 1939 film Gone with the Wind. Jory received his Actor's Equity card as a young child.

Work
He was at the forefront of the regional theater movement of the 1960s, which began with the opening of the Guthrie Theater in 1963, showing that not all theater talent was centralized in New York City and Los Angeles. Jory served as artistic director of the Long Wharf Theatre from 1965 to 1966; his contract was terminated once the fledgling theater hit rough financial waters. In 1969, he took over the helm of Actors Theatre of Louisville, a small regional theater just five years old. Under his leadership, it became one of the top theaters in the country. Jory's major accomplishment was the foundation and cultivation of the annual Humana Festival of New American Plays in Louisville, beginning in 1976. It has since produced a number of outstanding plays including The Gin Game (1978), Crimes of the Heart (1981), Cementville (1991) and Dinner with Friends (1998), not to mention almost everything Jane Martin has ever written. In 2017, Jory began teaching at the UCLA Department of Theater as a Visiting Professor.

Retirement and honours
Jory retired from Actors Theatre in 2000. That fall, he joined the faculty at the University of Washington School of Drama as Professor of Acting and Directing. Also, in 2000, Jory was inducted into the American Theatre Hall of Fame. He is the President's Chair of the Performing Arts Department at Santa Fe University of Art and Design.

He holds honorary doctorates from the University of Utah, the University of Louisville, and Bellarmine University.

Asked if Jane Martin's identity will be revealed after her death, Jory has stated with a laugh, "That's a press conference no one will come to. By the time I die, no one will care anyway."

Publications
 Actor's Choice: Monologues for Men Playscripts, Inc.
 Actor's Choice: Scenes for Teens Playscripts, Inc.
 Anne of Green Gables Playscripts, Inc.
 The Bear Brooklyn Publishers
 Captain Hook and the Warrior Amazons Heuer Publishing
 Captain Hook's Very Bad Christmas Heuer Publishing
 The Circus of the Seven Deadly Sins Brooklyn Publishers
Darcy and Elizabeth Playscripts, Inc.
 Detective Father Brown Heuer Publishing
The Drama School From Hell Playscripts, Inc.
Emma Playscripts, Inc.
 The Explosive Fairy Tale Princess Diaries Brooklyn Publishers
 Friday Night Live! Brooklyn Publishers
 The Gift of the Magi Brooklyn Publishers
The Gift of the Magi Playscripts, Inc.
 Goddess Gap Year Brooklyn Publishers
 The Great Cases of Sherlock Holmes Heuer Publishing
 The Haunted House Farce Heuer Publishing
 Mean Girls in Fairyland Brooklyn Publishers
 Orpheus and What's-Her-Name Brooklyn Publishers
Passing Periods at Pomegranate Prep Pioneer Drama Service, 2018
Pride and Prejudice Playscripts, Inc.
The Prom Game Playscripts, Inc.
Salvador Dali at the Beach Playscripts, Inc.
 The Secret Lives of Superheroes, Vol. 1 Heuer Publishing
 The Secret Lives of Superheroes, Vol. 2 Heuer Publishing
Sense and Sensibility Playscripts, Inc.
 Sherlock Holmes' Hat Heuer Publishing
Sherlock in Love Pioneer Drama Service, 2019
Sixty Second Singles Playscripts, Inc.
The Whatsit Pioneer Drama Service, 2017
 Wilbur Peppy's Burger Quest Heuer Publishing
 20/20 : twenty one-act plays from twenty years of the Humana Festival / edited by Michele Volansky and Michael Bigelow Dixon; foreword by Jon Jory. Smith and Kraus, Lyme, NH 
 Tips. ideas for actors Smith & Kraus Pub Inc, 2000, 
 Tips. ideas for directors Smith & Kraus Pub Inc, 2002, 
 Tips II. more ideas for actors Smith & Kraus Pub Inc, 2004, 
 Pride and Prejudice: A Romantic Comedy Playscripts Inc, 2006
 University: a full evening of theatre in ten parts Dramatic Publishing, 1983
 Love, Death and the Prom Dramatic Publishing, 1991,

References

External links

 Biographical article on The Playwrights Database

American theatre directors
University of Washington faculty
Place of birth missing (living people)
Year of birth missing (living people)
Arts in Louisville, Kentucky
Artists from Louisville, Kentucky
Living people
College of Santa Fe faculty